Alan David Gold (born 1945) is a novelist, columnist, and human rights activist.

Life and career
Born in Leicester, United Kingdom, Alan Gold began his working life on British provincial newspapers such as the Leicester Mercury before becoming a freelance correspondent in the United Kingdom and Europe. He and his wife Eva moved to Australia in 1970.

He has written thirty books which have been published and translated internationally. His novels deal with a wide range of subjects, most often associated with modern and ancient history and politics and Judaism.

He is a regular literary critic for The Australian and also an opinion columnist for The Spectator Australia. In June 2000, he was the New South Wales Human Rights Orator, as well as the B'nai B'rith Human Rights Orator in Sydney and Melbourne. He is a visiting guest lecturer in literature at major Australian universities and a regular lecturer and speaker on matters of literature, racism, and human rights.

He is a past President of the Anti-Defamation Unit of B'nai B'rith, is a member of think tanks the Sydney Institute and the Centre for Independent Studies, and has been a board member of the international writers' centre, Varuna, the Vice President of the human rights program Courage to Care, and the literary co-ordinator of the New South Wales University Shalom College's Festival, Limmud Oz. He is a visiting scholar to the Melbourne Limmud Oz.

He is married with three children and lives in Sydney, Australia.

Bibliography

Books

Essays and columns 

 Growing internet dependence sapping our life skills

References

External links
Simon & Schuster author page
HarperCollins author page

1945 births
Living people
20th-century Australian novelists
20th-century Australian male writers
21st-century Australian novelists
Australian male novelists
Australian people of German-Jewish descent
Jewish Australian writers
Writers from Sydney
British emigrants to Australia
English Jews
English people of German-Jewish descent
The Spectator people
21st-century Australian male writers